Adana is a  large city in southern Turkey. The administrative seat of Adana province, which had a population of 2.274 million according to the official end-2022 estimates, the city itself had a population of 1,779,463 at that date, making it the fifth most populous city in Turkey.

Adana lies in the heart of Cilicia, which was once one of the most important regions of the classical world. Home to six million people, Cilicia is an important agricultural area, owing to the large fertile plain of Çukurova.

Twenty-first century Adana is a centre for regional trade, healthcare, and public and private services. Agriculture and logistics are important parts of the economy.

Adana Şakirpaşa Airport is close to the city centre, and the town is connected to Tarsus and Mersin by TCDD train.

Etymology
The name Adana has been used for over four millennia, making it one of the oldest continuously used place names in the world; the first mention of Adana came in Hittite tablets of around 2000 BC. It has had only minor pronunciation changes despite changing political control.

One theory holds that the city name originates from an Indo-European expression a danu 'on the river', using the same Proto-Indo-European root as the Danube, Don, Dnieper and Donets.

Greco-Roman legend suggests that the name of Adana originates from Adanus, the son of the Greek god Uranus, who founded the city next to the river with his brother Sarus, whose name was given to the river. An older legend, in Akkadian, Sumerian, Babylonian, Assyrian and Hittite mythologies, attributes the name to the storm and rain god, Adad, who lived in the surrounding forests. Hittite manuscripts found in the area reported the legend. The locals had great admiration for the god and called the region Uru Adaniyya ("Adana Region") in his honour. The city inhabitants were called Danuna.

In Homer's Iliad, the city is mentioned as Adana. For a brief period during the Hellenistic era, it was known as Ἀντιόχεια τῆς Κιλικίας ("Antioch of Cilicia") and as Ἀντιόχεια ἡ πρὸς Σάρον ("Antioch on the Sarus"). On some cuneiform tablets, the city name was given as Quwê, while some other sources call it Coa which could be the place where Solomon obtained his horses according to the Bible (I Kings 10:28; II Chronicles 1:16).

It is also sometimes suggested that the name is related to the Danaoi, the name for Greeks of the Trojan War in Homer and Thucydides.

Under Armenian rule, the city was known as Ատանա (Adana) or Ադանա (Atana).

According to Ali Cevad's Memalik-i Osmaniye Coğrafya Lügat (Ottoman Geographical Dictionary), the Muslims of Adana attributed the city's name to Ebu Süleym Ezene, who was appointed as Wāli by Abbasid Caliph Harun al-Rashid.

Other Ottoman and Islamic sources call the city Edene, Azana and Batana.

History
Adana is considered to be the oldest city of Cilicia, with a history  going back for eight millennia, making it one of the oldest continuously inhabited cities in the world. The history of the Tepebağ tumulus dates back to the Neolithic, to around 6000 BC, the time of the first human settlements. A place called Adana is mentioned by name in the Sumerian Epic of Gilgamesh.

The first people known to have lived in Adana and the surrounding area were the Luwians. They controlled the Mediterranean coast of Anatolia roughly from 3000 BC to around 1600 BC. Then the Hittites took over the region which came to be known as Kizzuwatna. Inhabited by Luwians and Hurrians, Kizzuwatna had an autonomous governance under Hittite protection, but they had a brief period of independence from the 1500s to 1420s BC. According to the Hittite inscription of Kava, found in Hattusa (Boğazkale), Kizzuwatna was ruling Adana, under the protection of the Hittites, by 1335 BC. From with the collapse of the Hittite Empire around 1191–1189 BC, native Denyen sea peoples took control of Adana and the plain until around 900 BC. Then Neo-Hittite states were founded in the region with the Quwê state centred on Adana. Quwê and other states were protected by the Neo-Assyrian Empire, though they had periods of independence too. After the Greek migration into Cilicia in the 8th century BC, the region was unified under the rule of the Mopsos dynasty and Adana was established as the capital. Bilingual inscriptions of the ninth and eighth centuries found in Mopsuestia (modern Yakapınar) were written in hieroglyphic Luwian and Phoenician. The Assyrians took control of the regions several times before their collapse in 612 BC.

Cilicians founded the Kingdom of Cilicia in 612 BC with the help of Syennesis I. The kingdom was independent until the invasion of the Achaemenid Empire in 549 BC, then became an autonomous satrapy of the Achaemenids until 401 BC. The uncertain loyalty of Syennessis during the rebellion of Cyrus the Younger led Artaxerxes II to abolish the Syennesis administration and replace it with a centrally appointed satrap. Archaeological remains of a procession reveal the existence of Persian nobility in Adana.

Alexander the Great entered Cilicia through the Cilician Gates in 333 BC. After defeating the Persians at the Battle of Issus, he installed his own satrap, Balacrus, to oversee the region's administration. His death in 323 BC marked the beginning of the  Hellenistic era, as Greek replaced Luwian as the language of the region. After a short time under Ptolemaic dominion, the Seleucid Empire took control of the region in 312 BC. Adanan locals adopted a Greek name - Antioch on Sarus - for the city to demonstrate their loyalty to the Seleucid dynasty. The adopted name and the motifs illustrating the personification of the city seated above the river-god Sarus on the city's coins, suggest a special appreciation of the rivers which were a strong part of the Cilician identity. The Seleucids ruled Adana for more than two centuries until they were weakened by a civil war which led them to offer allegiance to Tigranes II, the King of Armenia who conquered a vast part of the Levant. Cilicia became a vassal state of the Kingdom of Armenia in 83 BC and new settlements were founded by Armenians in the region.

Romano-Byzantine era 

The Roman general Pompey took over the whole of Cilicia and organised it as a Roman province in 64 BC. Adana was of relatively minor importance during this period, while nearby Tarsus and Anazarbus were more important metropolises. During the era of Pompey, the city was used as a prison for the pirates who frequently ravaged the Cilician coast and disrupted trade. A bridge over the Sarus (Taşköprü) was built in the early 2nd century, and for several centuries thereafter, the city was a waystation on a Roman military road leading to the East.

In the early period of Roman rule, Zoroastrianism, that had been introduced to the region by the Persians, was still observed in Cilicia as was Judaism which attracted many sympathisers. As home to some of the earliest Christian missionary efforts, Cilicia welcomed Christianity more easily than some other provinces.

After the permanent partitioning of the Roman Empire in 395 AD, the Adana area became a part of the Byzantine Empire, and was probably developed during the time of Julian the Apostate. With the construction of large bridges, roads, government buildings, irrigation and plantations, Adana and Cilicia became the most developed and important regional trade centres. 

Adana became a Christian bishopric, a suffragan of the metropolitan see of Tarsus, but was raised to the rank of an autocephalous archdiocese after 680, the year in which its bishop appeared as a simple bishop at the Third Council of Constantinople, but before its listing in a 10th-century Notitiae Episcopatuum as an archdiocese. The Bishop Paulinus participated in the First Council of Nicaea in 325. Piso was among the Arianism-inclined bishops at the Council of Sardica (344) who withdrew and set up their own council at Philippopolis; he later returned to orthodoxy and signed the profession of Nicene faith at a synod in Antioch in 363. Cyriacus was at the First Council of Constantinople in 381. Anatolius is mentioned in a letter of Saint John Chrysostom. Cyrillus was at the Council of Ephesus in 431 and at a synod in Tarsus in 434. Philippus took part in the Council of Chalcedon in 451 and was a signatory of the joint letter of the bishops of Cilicia Prima to Byzantine Emperor Leo I the Thracian in 458 protesting at the murder of Proterius of Alexandria. Ioannes participated in the Third Council of Constantinople in 680. No longer a residential bishopric, Adana is today listed by the Catholic Church as a titular see.

Period of Byzantine and Islamic rivalry 

At the Battle of Sarus in April 625, Heraclius defeated the forces of Shahrbaraz of the Sasanian Empire that were stationed on the east bank of the river, after a fearless charge across the bridge built by the Emperor Justinian (now Taşköprü). The Byzantines defended the region from the encroaching Islamic Caliphates throughout the 7th century, but it was finally conquered in 704 by the Umayyad Caliph Abd al-Malik. Under Umayyad rule, Cilicia became a no man's land frontier between Byzantine Christian and Arab Muslim forces. In 746, profiting from the unstable conditions in the Umayyad Caliphate, the Byzantine Emperor Constantine V took control of Adana. The Abbasid Caliphate took over rule of the region from the Byzantines after Al-Mansur became caliph in 756. Under Abbasid rule, Muslims started settling in Cilicia for the first time.

Abandoned for more than fifty years, Adana was garrisoned and re-settled from 758 to 760. So that it could form a thughūr on the Byzantine frontier, Cilicia was colonised by the Turkic Sayābija tribe from Khorasan. The city saw rapid economic and cultural growth during the reigns of Harun al-Rashid and Al-Amin. Abbasid rule continued for more than two centuries until the Byzantines retook control of Adana in 965. The city became part of the Seleucia theme. After the great Byzantine defeat at the Battle of Manzikert in 1071, the emperor Romanos IV Diogenes was removed from the throne by a coup. He then gathered an army to regain power but was defeated and had to retreat to Adana. There he was forced to surrender after receiving assurances of his personal safety.

Armenian Kingdom of Cilicia 
Suleiman ibn Qutulmish, the founder of the Anatolian Seljuk Sultanate, annexed Adana in his campaign in 1084. During the Crusades, Cilicia had been criss-crossed by invading armies until it was eventually captured by the forces of the Armenian Principality of Cilicia in 1132, under its king, Leo I. It was retaken by Byzantine forces in 1137, but the Armenians regained it again in around 1170. During the Armenian era, Adana continued as a centre for handicrafts and international trade. As part of an ancient network from Asia Minor to North Africa, the Near East and India. Venetian and Genoese merchants frequented the city to sell goods imported through the port at Ayas. In 1268, the devastating Cilicia earthquake destroyed much of the city and eighty years later, in 1348, the Black Death reached the region and caused severe depopulation. Adana remained part of the Armenian Kingdom of Cilicia until 1359, when the city was lost to the Turkmen supporting the Mamluk Sultanate who Cilicia captured the plain.

Ramadanid Emirate

The Mamluks built garrisons in Tarsus, Ayas and Sarvandikar (Savranda), and left the administration of the plain of Adana to Yüreğir Turks who had already formed a Mamluk authorised Türkmen Emirate in the Camili area, just southeast of Adana, in 1352. The Emir, Ramazan Bey, designated Adana his capital, and led the Yüreğir Turks as they settled the city. The Ramadanid Emirate, was de facto independent throughout the 15th century as a result of being a thughūr in Ottoman-Mamluk relations. In 1517, Selim I incorporated the emirate into the Ottoman Empire after his conquest of the Mamluk state. The Ramadanid Beys held onto the administration of the new Ottoman Sanjak of Adana by a hereditary title until 1608.

Ottoman and Egyptian eras 

The Ottomans terminated the Ramadanid administration in 1608 after the Celali rebellions and began direct rule from Constantinople through an appointed Vali. In late 1832, the Vali of Egypt, Muhammad Ali Pasha, invaded Syria, and reached Cilicia. The Convention of Kütahya signed on 14 May 1833 ceded Cilicia to the de facto independent Egypt. At that time, the Sanjak of Adana's population of 68,934 had hardly any urban services. The first neighbourhood (Verâ-yı Cisr) east of the river was founded and Alawites were brought from Syria to work in the flourishing agricultural lands. İbrahim Paşa, the son of Muhammad Ali Paşa, demolished Adana Castle and the city walls in 1836. He built the first canals for irrigation and transportation and also built a water system for the residential areas of the town, including wheels that raised the water of the river for public fountains. After the Oriental crisis, the Convention of Alexandria signed on 27 November 1840 required the return of Cilicia to Ottoman sovereignty.

The American Civil War that broke out in 1861 interrupted the flow of cotton to Europe and European cotton traders turned their attentions to fertile Cilicia. Adana had developed as a hub for cotton trading and had become one of the most prosperous Ottoman cities. New Armenian, Turkish, Greek, Chaldean, Jewish and Alawite neighbourhoods were founded around what had been a walled city. The Adana–Mersin railway line opened in 1886, connecting Adana to international ports through the port in Mersin.

By the turn of the 20th century, further migration attracted by large-scale industrialisation grew Adana's population to over 107,000: That population was made up of 62,250 Muslims (Turks, Alawites, Circassians, Kurds), 30,000 Armenians, 8,000 Chaldeans, 5,000 Greeks, 1,250 Assyrians, 500 Arab Christians and 200 internationals.

Adana massacre of 1909

In the early 20th century the local economy thrived and the Armenian population doubled as people fled the Hamidian massacres. When the revolution of July 1908 brought about the end of Abdulhamid II's autocratic rule, the Armenian community felt empowered to imagine an autonomous Cilicia. The CUP's post-revolution mismanagement of the vilayets caused the pro-diversity Vali Bahri Pasha to be removed from office in late 1908. He was replaced by the weak Cevad Bey. Taking advantage of this, Bağdadizade Abdülkadir (later Paksoy), the local leader of the Cemiyet-i Muhammediye, took almost complete control of the local government and led an action plan to "punish" Armenians throughout Cilicia. Rumours of an upcoming Armenian attack, raised tension in the Turkish neighbourhoods. As soon as news of the countercoup reached Cilicia, enraged members of the Cemiyet-i Muhammediye and dissatisfied peasants left out of work by mechanisation flocked to the city on market day. After staying overnight in the city, the groups and their local supporters started attacking Armenian shops on the morning of 14 April 1909. Later in the day the attacks were also directed at Armenian dwellings and spread to the rest of Cilicia. Armed Armenians defended themselves and the clashes lasted until April 17.

After a week of silence, 850 soldiers from regiments of the Ottoman Army arrived in the city on April 25. Shots were fired at the campground and a rumour immediately spread that the Armenians had opened fire from a church tower. Without even investigating the rumour, the military commander Mustafa Remzi Pasha directed soldiers and bashi-bazouks towards the Armenian quarters and for three days they shot people, destroyed buildings and burned down Christian neighbourhoods. The pogroms of 25–27 April were on a much greater scale than the clashes of 14–17 April, and almost all the casualties were Christian.

The Adana massacre of April 1909 resulted in the deaths of 18,839 Armenians, 1,250 Greeks, 850 Assyrians, 422 Chaldeans and 620 Muslims. Adding in the roughly 2,500 Hadjinian and other seasonal workers who disappeared, the death toll in the entire Vilayet is estimated to have been around 25,500. Over the summer 2,000 children died of dysentery and a few thousand adults died of injuries or from epidemics. The massacre orphaned 3,500 children and caused heavy destruction of Christian properties. Cevad Bey and Mustafa Remzi Pasha were sacked and given light sentences for abuse of power, and on 8 August 1909, Djemal Pasha was appointed the new Vali. He quickly rebuilt relations with the surviving Armenian community and gathered financial support to found a new neighbourhood  for Armenians called Çarçabuk (now Döşeme). He also ordered the construction of two orphanages and the restoration of destroyed buildings.

The Cilicia section of the Berlin–Baghdad railway had opened in 1912, connecting Adana to the Middle East. Within a few years, the city had regained its momentum and by the turn of 1915, the Armenian population numbered up to 30,000, not far short of the figure from before 1909.

The Armenian Genocide of 1915
Early in May 1915, Vali Ismail Hakkı Bey received an order from Constantinople (now İstanbul) to deport the Armenians of Adana. The Vali was able to delay the deportations and let the Armenians sell their movable assets to acquire money for the journey. The first convoy of deportees consisting of more than 4,000 Armenians left the city on May 20. The Catholicos of Cilicia, Sahak II, wrote a letter to Djemal Pasha, the then Syria-Cilicia General Vali to prevent further deportations and the chief secretary Kerovpe Papazian met the pasha in Aley in Lebanon in early June and delivered the message of the Catholicos. Djemal Pasha immediately wired the Vali ordering him not to deport more Armenians. As a result of his efforts, the Adana Armenians earned a stay of execution for the summer, while the rest of the Cilician Armenians were being deported and hundreds of thousands of exhausted Armenian deportees from Western Anatolia were passing through the city. Armenian intellectuals  Rupen Zartarian, Sarkis Minassian, Nazaret Daghavarian, Harutiun Jangülian, and Karekin Khajag, who were deported from Constantinople on April 24th, were kept in custody in the Vilayet offices for a few days. They failed to be able to arrange a meeting with the Catholicos at the Cathedral, their last attempt at survival. Later in June, two prominent leaders, Krikor Zohrab and Vartkes Serengülian, were also kept in the city during their final journey towards Diyarbakır.

The Minister of the Interior, Talaat Pasha, wanted to end the exemption of Adana Armenians and sent his second in command, Ali Munif, to the city in mid-August to order the resumption of the deportations. Ali Munif immediately deported 250 families who were accused of insurrection. Before the remaining Armenians were deported, the Vali again arranged for them to sell their assets. As almost a third of the city's residents were selling their belongings, the city must have seemed like the site of a massive clearance sale. The deportation of 5,000 Armenian families in eight convoys started on 2 September 1915 and continued until the end of October. One thousand craftsmen, state officers and army personnel and their families were exempted from deportation. Unlike the deportees of other Vilayets, many of Adana's Armenians were sent to Damascus and further south, thereby avoiding the death camps of Deir ez-Zor, at the request of Djemal Pasha. During the course of the Armenian genocide, the death rate of the roughly 25,000 Armenians deported from Adana in 1915 was a lot lower than that of deportees from other regions for three main reasons: there were no reports of direct killings in and around the city; many were deported to the Damascus area; and some had money to keep them going.

French rule

The Armistice of Mudros, signed on 30 October 1918, ended Ottoman participation in World War I. The terms of the armistice ceded control of Cilicia to France. In December the French government sent four battalions of the Armenian Legion to take over Adana and oversee the repatriation of more than 170,000 Armenians to Cilicia. Returning Armenians negotiated with France to establish an autonomous State of Cilicia and Mihran Damadian, the chief negotiator for the Armenians, signed a provisional Constitution of Cilicia in 1919. Pre-war life resumed with the re-opening of churches, schools, cultural centres and businesses.

However, the French forces were spread thinly across Cilicia and the villages to which people returned came under attack from the Turkish Kuva-yi Milliye. The costs and difficulties associated with the repatriation process, and growing Arab nationalism within the Syria mandate forced the French High Commissioners to meet the Turkish leader, Mustafa Kemal Pasha, several times in late 1919 and early 1920, resulting in a halt to the deployment of extra forces to Cilicia. A truce arranged on 28 May 1920 between the French and the Kemalists, led the French forces to retreat south of the Mersin-Osmaniye railroad. The subsequent evacuation of thousands of Armenians from Sis and its environs and their migration to Adana raised the number of Armenians in the city to more than 100,000. Throughout June, the Armenian Legion, along with repatriated Armenians and Assyrians, committed vengeful acts against the Turks, killing hundreds around Kahyaoğlu, Kocavezir, Camili and İncirlik. On 10 July 1920, to ease the overpopulation south of the railroad, a Franco-Armenian operation forced the local Turkish population to escape north. Roughly 40,000 Turks from Adana and around fled to the countryside and to the mountains north, an event known as the Kaç Kaç incident, which lasted for four days and claimed hundreds of lives. The Turkish Cilician Society and national  defence associations then met at a congress in Pozantı on 5 August 1920 to re-establish Turkish rule over Cilicia. On the same day, Mihran Damadian declared the autonomy of Cilicia by coming to an agreement with the city's Christian communities. However, the French government did not recognise its autonomy, expelled the community leaders and disbanded the Armenian Legion in September.

As the political environment changed, the French abandoned all claims to Cilicia, which they had originally hoped to attach to their mandate over Syria. On 9 March 1921, the Cilicia Peace Treaty was signed  between France and the Turkish Grand National Assembly. However, it did not achieve its intended goals and was replaced by the Treaty of Ankara, signed on 20 October 1921. Under the terms of this agreement, France recognised the end of the Cilicia War and agreed to withdraw provided that the Christian communities' rights were protected. Those Armenians who were not satisfied with such guarantees rushed to Mersin port and Dörtyol, and had evacuated their homeland of two millennia by December 1921. The French troops together with the remaining Armenian volunteers then withdrew from the city on 5 January 1922.

In 1922, up to 10,000 local Greeks moved to Greece before the policy of Greco-Turkish population exchange took effect. Among the 172,000 Armenians in the Adana area just before the Cilicia Evacuation, 80,000 took refuge in Syria or Lebanon while up 10,000 of them migrated to Cyprus, Izmir and Istanbul. The remained 82,000 or so Armenians most likely remained in the Adana area and assimilated into Turkish/Muslim society.  Armenians who settled in Lebanon founded the Nor Adana (English: New Adana) neighbourhood within the mostly Armenian town of Bourj Hammoud, north-east of Beirut. From the 1920s onwards, around 60 percent of Cilician Armenians moved to Argentina. An informal census of 1941 revealed that 70 percent of all the Armenian Argentines in Buenos Aires had Adana origins.

Modern Turkey
On 15 April 1923, just before the signing of the Treaty of Lausanne, the Turkish government enacted the "Law of Abandoned Properties" which confiscated the properties of Armenians and Greeks who were not present there. Adana became one of the cities with the most confiscated property, which meant that muhacirs (immigrants) from the Balkans and Crete, as well as migrants from Kayseri and Darende were resettled in the Armenian and Greek neighbourhoods, with more modest pieces of land, houses and workshops distributed to them. The large farms, factories, stores and mansions were granted to Kayseri notables (e.g. Nuh Naci Yazgan, Nuri Has, Mustafa Özgür) and to local nationalists (e.g. Sefa Özler, Ali Münif) as promised at the Sivas Congress by Mustafa Kemal (later Atatürk). Within a decade, the city experienced drastic demographic change, socially and economically, and turned into an almost entirely Muslim/Turkish city. The remaining Jews and Christians were hammered by the burden of the Wealth Tax in 1942, causing most to leave Adana, selling their properties at way below their actual value to families like the Sabancıs, who built their wealth on such confiscated or undervalued properties.

On 27 June 1998, the city was hit by a 6.2 magnitude earthquake which killed 145 and left 1500 people wounded and many thousand homeless in the city centre and in Ceyhan district. The economic loss was estimated at about US$1 billion.

On 6 February 2023, Adana was one of the major cities in Southern Turkey affected by a 7.8 magnitude earthquake.

Geography

Adana is located on the 37th parallel north on the northeastern edge of the Mediterranean, occupying the center of the Cilician plain; a relatively large stretch of flat, fertile land that lies southeast of the Taurus Mountains.

The Seyhan (likely from ) divides Adana into its two metropolitan districts, and is the main source for Adana's fertile alluvial soils, while also being responsible for the region's proclivity to regular winter and spring floods, which affected the city until embankments were built in the 1900s. The Seyhan Dam, completed in 1956, was constructed for hydroelectric power, along with plans to irrigate the lower Çukurova plain more regularly than the floodplain could naturally provide. Therefore, two irrigation channels now flow into the plain, crossing the city centre from east to west.

Heading west across Cilicia from Adana, the path to Tarsus crosses the foothills of the Taurus Mountains, eventually reaching an altitude of nearly  while passing through the Cilician Gates, a rocky mountain pass functioning as the main artery to the Turkish hinterland.

Climate

Adana has a hot-summer Mediterranean climate (Csa) under the Köppen classification, and a dry summer subtropical climate (Cs) under the Trewartha classification. Winters are mild and wet. Frost does occasionally occur at night almost every winter, but snow is a very rare phenomenon. Summers are long, hot, humid and dry. During heatwaves, the temperature often reaches or exceeds .

Governance

Adana Metropolitan Municipality covers an area of  around the City Hall. Four levels of government are involved in the administration of the city; national, provincial, metropolitan and district municipalities.The Government of Turkey in Ankara holds most of the power: health, education, the police and many other city-related services are administered by Ankara through an appointed Governor. The national government is also the lawmaker, adjudicator and auditor of all the other levels of government and the neighbourhood administration. The semi-democratic provincial governing body, the Adana Province Special Administration, has minor powers, dealing mainly with construction and the maintenance of primary schools, daycares and other state buildings plus some social services. Municipal governance is run via a two-tier structure: the Metropolitan Municipality forms the upper tier and the district municipalities form the lower tier. The Metropolitan Municipality takes care of construction and the maintenance of major roads and parks, and operates local transit and fire services. The district municipalities are responsible for neighbourhood streets, parks, garbage collections and cemetery services. The district municipalities are further divided into neighbourhoods (mahalle) administrations, the smallest administrative units of the city.

Metropolitan municipality

Adana Municipality was incorporated in 1871 though the city continued to be governed under the muhtesip system until 1877 by the first mayor Gözlüklü Süleyman Efendi. Modern municipal governance began with the second mayor Kirkor Bezdikyan and his successor Sinyor Artin. Roads were widened and paved with cobblestones, drainage canals and trenches were cut, and the first municipal regulations were put into effect. After the founding of the republic in 1923, major infrastructure projects were carried out and the first planned neighbourhoods were built to the north of the city. Turhan Cemal Beriker served as mayor and governor from 1926 to 1938. With the completion of the Seyhan Dam in 1956, the city saw explosive growth and the then prime minister Adnan Menderes showed special interest in Adana, initiating large-scale infrastructure projects like citywide underground sewer systems and rezoning residential areas. Since 1984, the cityscape has seen great change with the revitalisation of the Seyhan river and the construction of large parks and boulevards.

Metropolitan Municipality Law was introduced in 1989 when municipal governance was split between the metropolitan municipality and the district municipalities. Adana Municipality became the Metropolitan Municipality and two new district municipalities - Seyhan and Yüreğir - were founded. Karaisalı was annexed to the city in 2006, while the Çukurova and Sarıçam districts were founded in 2008 by partitioning the Seyhan and Yüreğir districts. On 3 February 2012, Karataş Municipal Council agreed to amalgamate with Adana, hence Karataş will become the city's sixth district after the transition process is complete.

The Metropolitan Municipality consists of three organs: the Metropolitan Council, the Mayor and the Encümen or Executive Committee. Each district municipal council elects one-fifth of their members to represent it at the metropolitan council. Thus, the metropolitan council consists of 35 councillors, ten from Seyhan district, eight from Yüreğir, eight from Çukurova, six from Sarıçam, two from Karaisalı and the metropolitan mayor who is elected directly by the voters. The executive committee consists of ten members, five being metropolitan councillors and the other five directors at the metropolitan hall who are appointed by the metropolitan mayor.

Districts

The City of Adana consists of the urban areas of the four metropolitan districts; Seyhan, Yüreğir, Çukurova and Sarıçam. Seyhan district is fully within the city limits whereas the Yüreğir, Çukurova and Sarıçam districts have rural areas outside the city.

Seyhan district, west of the Seyhan River, is the city's cultural and business centre. The D-400 state road (also called Turhan Cemal Beriker Boulevard within the city limits) divides the district into north and south. Seyhan north of the D-400 is the most economically developed part of the city. Hotels, cultural centres, commercial and public buildings line the D-400. The Old Town to the south of the D-400 is the shopping district with a mixture of traditional and modern shops. South of the old town is a low-income residential area.

Çukurova district is a modern residential district that lies north of Seyhan district and south of the Seyhan Reservoir. It was planned in the mid-1980s to direct the urban sprawl towards land north of the city. Called New Adana, the project consisted of 200,000 homes including villas along the lake shore and high-rise apartment blocks along the wide, newly opened boulevards of Turgut Özal, Süleyman Demirel and Kenan Evren.

Yüreğir district, east of the river, consists mainly of large-scale industry and low-income residential areas. With the construction of new bridges over the river and the extension of the metro line, Yüreğir became increasingly important, with the Adana Court of Justice re-locating to the district and a 47.5-hectare health campus planned for the Kazım Karabekir neighbourhood. An extensive urban redevelopment plan will also convert the Sinanpaşa, Yavuzlar, Köprülü and Kışla neighbourhoods into modern residential areas.

The district of Sarıçam lies north and east of Yüreğir and consists of former municipalities that were amalgamated into the City of Adana in 2008. Some of the city's larger institutions are in Sarıçam such as Çukurova University, the İncirlik Air Base and the Organised Industrial Region.

Neighbourhoods
Individual neighbourhoods (mahalle) are administrative units within the district municipalities and are administered by the muhtar (headman) and the Neighborhood Seniors Council. Although elected by the neighbourhood residents, the muhtar is not granted any powers but functions as an administrator of the national government. The muhtar can raise neighbourhood issues with the district municipality and has a seat at the Adana City Assembly, an umbrella organisation for the coordination of public institutions in the city. Even though neighbourhood administrations cannot provide social services nor provide funding to increase the involvement of residents in local issues, many residents still identify strongly with their neighbourhoods.

There are a total of 254 neighbourhoods in the city. Seyhan has 99 neighbourhoods, 69 of them in the original urban area and 30 in the neighbourhoods of the former municipalities and the former villages that were converted into neighbourhoods. Yüreğir has 99 neighbourhoods, 38 in the urban area and 61 in the rural. There are 29 neighbourhoods in Sarıçam, 16 neighbourhoods in Çukurova and 11 in Karaisalı district. A neighbourhood population can range from 150 to 63,000. Some neighbourhoods, especially in the Çukurova district, are very large—almost the size of a town—making access to muhtars difficult.

Tepebağ, Kayalıbağ, Kuruköprü, Ulucami, Sarıyakup and Alidede are the historical neighbourhoods of Adana. The planned neighbourhoods of the Republican era - Reşatbey, Cemalpaşa, Kurtuluş and Çınarlı - form the core of the city's cultural life. Güzelyalı, Karslılar and Kurttepe are scenic neighbourhoods overlooking the Seyhan reservoir.

Economy

A major centre for grain and cotton production in the Ottoman period, Adana was one of Turkey's first industrialised cities and is now one of its most economically developed cities. A mid-size trading city until the mid-1800s, the city attracted European traders after the United States, a major cotton supplier, became embroiled in its Civil War. Cilician farmers exported agricultural products for the first time and started building up capital. By the start of the 20th century, factories, almost all of them processing cotton, began to operate here but most were shut down and the economy almost ground to a standstill in 1915 after the genocide of Armenians who ran most of the city's businesses. The coming of the Republic accelerated industrialisation as closed plants were re-activated and state-owned plants opened. With the construction of the Seyhan Dam and improvements in agricultural techniques, there was an explosive growth in agricultural production during the 1950s. Large-scale industry grew up along the D-400 highway and the Karataş road. A service industry, especially banking, developed during this period. Rapid economic growth continued until the mid-1980s and movie makers were attracted to the region.

Extensive neo-liberal policies adopted by then Prime Minister Turgut Özal to centralise Turkey's economy caused almost all the Adana-based companies to move their headquarters to Istanbul. The decline in cotton planting raised the cost of raw material for manufacturing, and the city saw a wave of plant closures starting from the mid-1990s. Young professionals fled the city, contributing to Adana's unenviable status as the country's top brain drain city. Financial and human capital flight from Adana has continued to increase since 2002 due to the government's neo-liberal centralisation policies similar to Özal's. In 2010, unemployment in the city reached a record 19.1 percent. After 20 years of stagnation, Adana's economy is starting to pick up again with investments in the tourism and service industries, and the wholesale and retail sectors, and the city is being re-shaped as a regional centre.

Adana was named among the 25 European Regions of the Future for 2006/2007 by Foreign Direct Investment magazine. Chosen alongside Kocaeli, Adana scored the highest points for cost effectiveness against Kocaeli's points for infrastructure development, while the two towns tied for points in the categories of human resources and quality of life.

Commerce

A leading commercial centre in southern Turkey, Adana hosts the regional headquarters of many corporate and public institutions. TÜYAP Exhibition and Congress Center hosts fairs and business conferences, and is currently the main meeting point for businesses in Çukurova. The academic oriented 2000-seater Alper Akınoğlu Congress Center is expected to open in 2012 at Çukurova University campus.

The Adana Chamber of Commerce (ATO) was founded in 1894 to guide and regulate the cotton trade and it is one of the oldest of its kind in Turkey. Today the Chamber has more than 25,000 member companies, and furthers the interests of businesses and advocates on their behalf. The Adana Commodity Exchange, founded in 1913, functions mainly to organise the trade in agricultural produce and livestock. It is located opposite the Metropolitan Theatre.

The designation of the coastal areas of Ceyhan and Yumurtalık districts as Energy-specific Industrial Areas has made Adana an attraction for hotel building. Current 5-star hotels of the city, Hilton, Seyhan and Sürmeli will be complemented by Sheraton and Türkmen hotels on the river bank, Ramada and Divan hotels in the city center, Anemon hotel at the west end which are all currently under construction.

Agriculture
Adana is the marketing and distribution centre for the Çukurova agricultural region, where cotton, wheat, corn, soy bean, barley, grapes and citrus fruits are produced in great quantities. Adana's farmers produce half of Turkey's corn and soy beans. Thirty-four percent of Turkey's peanuts and 29 percent of Turkey's oranges are harvested in Adana. Most of the local farming and agricultural-based companies have their offices in Adana. Producer co-operatives play a significant role in the city's economy. Çukobirlik, Turkey's largest co-operative producer, has 36,064 members in ten provinces and does everything from planting to the marketing of cotton, peanuts, soybeans, sunflowers and canola.

The Adana Agriculture Fair is the region's largest fair attracting more than 100,000 visitors from twenty nations. It hosts agriculture, livestock, poultry and dairy businesses. A Greenhouse and Gardening Fair takes place at the same time as the Agriculture Fair which is organised on a 3.5-hectare area of the TÜYAP Exhibition Center every October.

Manufacturing
Adana's large-scale industry is mostly centred on agriculture. Food processing and fabricating metal products are major industries, making up 27 percent of Adana's manufacturing, but furniture and rubber/plastic product manufacturing plants are also numerous. , Adana has eleven companies in Turkey's top 500 industrial firms. The largest company in Adana, Temsa Global, an automotive manufacturer, has more than 2500 employees and manufactures 4000 buses annually. Marsan-Adana is the largest margarine and plant oil factory in Turkey. Advansa Sasa is Europe's largest polyester manufacturer employing 2650. The Organised Industrial Region of Adana covers an area of 1225 hectare with 300 plants, most of them medium-scale.

Demographics
As of 31 December 2022, the total population of the four districts which comprise the city was 1,810,646. Note that this total includes 31,183 living in rural areas outside the city, mainly in Sarıçam District.

Two-thirds of Adana's residents live west of the Seyhan River, where the city was first founded. East of the river urban sprawl has been restricted by large institutions such as Çukurova University and the Incirlik Air Base.

According to Evliya Çelebi, during the 17th century, the town was mostly composed of Turkomans but also included Arabs, Greeks, Armenians, and Jews.

An Ottoman tax register from 1526 records sixteen Turkish and one Armenian residential area. During the 17th century more Armenians and Greeks settled in the city. Population growth slowed between 1885 and 1927 because of the Adana Massacre and the Armenian genocide, with earlier numbers only being rebuilt rather than increased by refugees brought in from the Balkans and Crete as part of the Population Exchange of 1923.

The demographics of the city changed significantly in the 1990s after the massive migration of Kurds, many of them having been forced to leave their villages in the southeast at the peak of the Turkey–PKK conflict. The Conos, a tribe of Romani people of Romania, settled in Adana during the Balkan Wars; today they mainly live around the Sinanpaşa neighbourhood. Around 8,000 Romani people live in Adana Province. There is also a sizeable community of migrants from the Balkans and Caucasia, who settled in Adana before and during the Balkan Wars.

There were 172,000 Armenians in the Adana area in 1921, just before the Cilicia Evacuation. Around 82,000 of them were not sent into exile which explains why they remained in Adana and assimilated into Turkish society. Ten thousand to 15,000 of the descendants, who are known as Crypto-Armenians, still practise their Armenian/Christian culture behind closed doors. There are also many descendants of the Armenian children given to orphanages or to Muslim families for fostering in 1909 and 1915. Altogether, Adana may have the largest number of assimilated Armenians in contemporary Turkey.  Adana is home to a community of around 2,000 British and Americans serving at NATO's Incirlik Air Base. Before 2003, the community numbered up to 22,000 but it declined after many troops were stationed in Iraq.

As with other cities on the Mediterranean and Aegean coasts, Adana has a strong secularist population. Amongst the people of faith, the majority of Turks, most of the Kurds and some of the Arabs are Sunni Muslim. Adana is also a stronghold of Alevism, many Alevis having moved to the city from Kahramanmaraş after the Maraş Massacre of 1978. Most of the Arabs of Adana are Alawites and often confused with Alevis. Alawite Arabs are known locally as Nusayri or Fellah. Adana also has a tiny community of Roman Catholics and a few Jewish families.

Local attractions

Architecture

The first traces of settlement in the quarter of Tepebağ, can be traced to the Neolithic Age. The quarter is next to the Taşköprü stone bridge and on a hill which gave it its name Tepebağ, meaning 'garden on the hill'. The city administration has launched a campaign to preserve the Ottoman houses near the river. A house where Atatürk stayed on Seyhan Caddesi now houses the Atatürk Museum.

Adana's golden age for architecture was the late 15th and 16th centuries when the Ramadanid principality chose it as their capital. The city grew rapidly during that period with many new neighbourhoods and most of the historical landmarks being built during this period. Thus Mamluk and Seljukid styles of architecture are dominant in Adana's architectural history. Taşköprü is the only remaining landmark from the Roman-Byzantine era, while a few public buildings were built during Ottoman rule.

Mosques 

The Ulu Cami, a külliye built in 1541 during the Ramadanid era, is the most interesting medieval mosque to survive in Adana along with its medrese and türbe. The mosque is made from black and white marble with decorative window surrounds and is famous for the 16th century Iznik tiles lining the interior. The minaret features unique Mamluk decoration and an orthogonal floor plan.

The Yağ Camii was originally built as the Church of St. James, then converted into a mosque by Ramazanoğlu Halil Bey in 1501. His successor Piri Mehmet Paşa added its minaret in 1525 and its medrese in 1558. It is in the Seljukid Grand Mosque style and has an attractive gate made of yellow stone.

The Yeni Camii (New Mosque) was built in 1724 by Abdülrezzak Antaki, and is still known to some as the Antaki Mosque. The influence of Mamluk architecture is visible. A rectangular building, it has interesting stonework on its south walls.

The Alemdar Mescidi, Şeyh Zülfi Mescidi, Kızıldağ Ramazanoğlu Mosque and Hasan Aga Camii (a 16th-century wooden mosque constructed without using nails) are also of historic value.

The huge and prominent Sabancı Merkez Camii (Sabancı Central Mosque) on the west bank of the Seyhan river is Adana's most visited mosque and one of the largest mosques in the Middle East. Built following Ottoman architectural traditions, the mosque was opened in 1998 to accommodate up to 28,500 worshippers. It has six minarets, four of them 99 meters high. Its dome has a diameter of 32 meters and is 54 meters above the prayer hall. Near the Seyhan Bridge, the mosque is visible over a wide area.

Museums and art galleries 
Adana Archaeological Museum originally opened in 1924 as one of Turkey's first ten museums. It moved to the west corner of Seyhan Bridge in 1972. The museum exhibits archeological works from all over the Çukurova. Notable exhibits include two statues of Augustus, the Achilles Sarcophagus depicting the Trojan War and statues found in the ancient cities of Magarsus and Augusta. In 2019 it moved to a completely new location in an abandoned textiles factory. A mosaic from Misis (Yaprakpınar) depicting Noah and twenty-three birds that he took into the Ark during the Flood has been moved into the new museum which also exhibits works excavated from the Misis Tumulus.

Adana Ethnography Museum opened inside a converted church in 1983. The courtyard contains the epitaphs and gravestones of Adana's leading figures of the 17th century. The interios exhibits clothing, jewellery and weaponry of Yörük (nomadic) villagers.

The Atatürk Museum focuses on the War of Independence and the first years of Republic in a mansion where Atatürk stayed during his trips to Adana.

Other museums, several of them in restored historic buildings, include the Karacaoğlan Museum of Literature, the Adana Museum of Cinema, the Yeşiloba Martyrs' Museum, the Mehmet Baltacı Museum of Photography and the Adana Urban Museum.

The State Fine Arts Gallery opened in the Sabancı Cultural Centre in 1982. Other public art galleries include the 75.Yıl Art Gallery in Atatürk Park, the Adana City Hall Art Gallery and the Art Gallery in the Seyhan Cultural Centre.

Bridges 
Of the bridges crossing the Seyhan river within the city, the most notable is the Taşköprü, a 2nd-century Roman bridge. Currently used by pedestrians and cyclists, it was, until 2007, the oldest bridge in the world to be open to motorised vehicles. Demirköprü is a railway bridge that was built in 1912 as part of the Berlin-Baghdad Railway project. Regülatör bridge, at the southern section of the city, is a road bridge as well as a regulator for the river water. There are also three footbridges, Seyhan and Mustafakemalpaşa road bridges, the bridge of the metro and the bridge of the motorway spanning the river.

Turkish Baths (Hamams) 
The Çarşı Hamam (Turkish bath of the Bazaar) was built in 1529 by Ramazanoğlu Piri Pasha and is Adana's largest hamam. It is has five domes and the interior is faced with marble. At the time it was built, water used to be brought from the Seyhan River using a sequence of canals and water wheels.

The Irmak Hamam (Turkish bath of the River), next to the Seyhan District Hall, was built in 1494 by Ramazanoğlu Halil Bey over the ruins of an ancient Roman bath. Its water comes from the river. Other historical hamams in the city are Mestenzade Bath and Yeni Bath.

Churches 

Nineteenth century Adana had four churches, two Armenian, one Greek Orthodox and one Roman Catholic. The Roman Catholic Saint Paul Church (Bebekli Kilise) was built in 1870 and is in the old town, close to 5 Ocak Square. It currently serves the Roman Catholic and Protestant communities.

The Agios Nikolaos (St Nicholas) Greek Orthodox Church was built in 1845 in the Kuruköprü area but was converted into a museum in 1950. It was reconsecrated as a church in 2015 and renamed the Kuruköprü Monumental Church.

The Armenian Church on Ali Münif Street, midway between the Yağ Camii and the Büyük Saat, was converted into a branch of the Ziraat Bank during the Republican Era. Surp Asdvadzadzin Armenian Apostolic Church on Abidinpaşa Street, which was in service until 1915, was used as a cinema until 1970 then demolished by the government. The Central Bank (Merkez Bankası) regional headquarters was built in its place.

Parks and gardens 
Adana has many parks and gardens. Owing to the warm climate, they are open all year round without the need for winter maintenance.

Paths along both banks of the Seyhan river track the city from the south end to the Seyhan Reservoir. The path then joins up with the wide sidewalks  of Adnan Menderes Boulevard which follows the southern shores of the Seyhan Reservoir, thereby extending the path to the west end of the reservoir. The most scenic stretch is Dilberler Sekisi on the west bank between the old and new dams. A path along the north side of the Grand Canal goes from the east end to the west end of the city, crossing the Seyhan river. Once completed, the network of paths within the city will cover almost , connecting several parks.

The Merkez Park (Central Park) is a 33-hectare urban park on both banks of the Seyhan river, just north of the Sabancı Merkez Mosque. With a 2100-seater amphitheatre, a Chinese Garden, a Rowing Club and two cafes, it is the city's main recreational area.

The Süleyman Demirel Arboretum is a large botanical garden containing collections of woody plants intended partly for scientific study by Çukurova University researchers. The arboretum is also used for recreational purposes by city residents. 512 species of plants can be found in the arboretum.

Atatürk Park is a 4.7-hectare city park built during the first years of the Republic in the central commercial district of the city. The park holds a statue of Atatürk and hosts public ceremonies.

Çobandede Park is a 16.5-hectare park on a hill overlooking the Seyhan Reservoir. It contains the tomb of Çoban Dede, a wise man from Karslı Village.

The Yaşar Kemal Woods serves as a hiking area on the eastern bank of the Seyhan river opposite Dilberler Sekisi. It is dedicated to the Çukurova-born writer Yaşar Kemal.

Çatalan Woods is a large recreational area between the Çatalan and Seyhan reservoirs in the Karaisalı district north of the city.

Other Attractions 
It was damaged during the French occupation, but was rebuilt in 1935, and its image appears on the city's coat of arms. The Kazancılar Çarşısı (Cauldron-makers Bazaar) grew up around the Büyük Saat.

Ramazanoğlu Hall was built in 1495 during the reign of Halil Bey. A three-story building, made of stone and brick, it is one of the oldest houses to survive in Turkey. The existing hall was the Harem section of the property where the Ramadanid family lived. Unfortunately, the Selamlık section, which contained the government offices, has been lost.

Society and culture 
One of the defining features of Adana is its agriculture-based life and the agriculture-based industrial culture associated with it. However, developments in industrial life, improvements in transportation, the effects of mass communication and large-scale migration have affected Adana's culture. As in other Turkish cities, the culture in different sections of the city is often very different from that in other areas.

Cuisine

Adana's cuisine is influenced mainly by Yörük (Nomad), Arabic and Armenian cookery. Spicy, sour and fatty dishes made of meat (usually lamb) and bulghur are common. In almost every home, bulghur and flour, red pepper, spices, tahini, a chopping block and a pastry board can be found. The bulghur used in cooking is made from a dark coloured hard wheat specific to Adana.

The Adana kebab, simply called "kebap" locally, is made from minced meat and is the most popular dining choice in the city. Since it can be found in all kebab restaurants in Turkey and in most Turkish restaurants around the world, the Adana name is still associated with the kebab for many people.

Adana kebab is usually served with an onion salad, green salad or a well-chopped tomato salad. Rakı or şalgam (turnip juice) usually accompany it.

There are many salads typical to Adana. Radish salad with tahini is very popular and is found only in the Çukurova region. Şalgam and pickle juice are the preferred  drinks for winter with aşlama (licorice juice) replacing them in summer.

A sweet called Seker Sucugu (Sweet Sausage) originated in Adana where it was invented by Sir Duran O. during the First World War, around 1915.

Alongside tomato paste, pepper paste is used in almost every dish. The city is also famous for its Şırdan a kind of sausage stuffed with rice and eaten with cumin; for paça, boiled sheep's feet; and for bicibici (pronounced as bee-jee-bee-jee) made from jellied starch, rose water and sugar and served with crushed ice especially in the summer. The city also offers a number of famous desserts, such as Halka Tatlı, a round-shaped dessert, and Taş Kadayıf, a bow-shaped dessert. Several types of fruit, including the apricot, are native to this area.

Arts and entertainment

Performing arts

The Çukurova State Symphony Orchestra performed its first concert in 1992 and now performs twice weekly from October to May at the Metropolitan Theatre Hall. The orchestra consists of thirty-nine musicians and conducts regular tours in Turkey and abroad.

The Adana State Theatre opened its doors in 1981 at the Sabancı Cultural Centre and performs regularly from October to May. The Adana Town Theatre was founded in 1880 by governor Ziya Paşa to be the city's first theatre. In 1926, it moved to the newly built Community Centre and currently performs weekly at the Metropolitan Theatre Hall and in the Ramazanoğlu Centre. The Seyhan Town Theatre and Seyhan Folkloric Dances hold weekly events in the Theatre Hall of Seyhan Cultural Centre.

Several Amphitheatres host performances from April to November. The Mimar Sinan Amphitheatre, the largest in Adana, can accommodate 8,000 spectators and hosts concerts and movies. It is located at the west bank of the Seyhan River. The 2,100-seater Merkez Park Amphitheater, 3,000-seater Çukurova University Amphitheater and the Doğal Park Amphitheater in Çukurova District also host plays, concerts and movies. Some historic buildings have also been restored and converted into cultural centres. The 515-year-old Ramazanoğlu Hall and 130-year-old former high school for girls (now called the Adana Centre for Arts and Culture) serve as cultural centres hosting art exhibitions and cultural events

Festivals
The Altın Koza International Film Festival is one of Turkey's foremost film festivals, taking place since 1969. At the same time the Long Film Contest, the International Student Film Contest and the Mediterranean Cultures Film Contest are held.

The International Sabancı Theatre Festival has been held every April since 1999. The opening show was staged on the Seyhan River and the Taşköprü by the Italian ensemble Studio Festi. The "Water Symphony" show was greeted with great enthusiasm.

An Orange Blossom Carnival is held every April, inspired by the scent of the city's orange-tree-lined streets. The carnival parade of 2015 attracted more than 90.000 people—the highest ever attendance at an outdoor event in Adana.

The International Çukurova Instrumental Music Festival is a two-week long festival held annually in Adana, Antakya and Gaziantep. In 2009, the fifth estival took place with an opening concert by the Çukurova State Symphony Orchestra. Baritone Marcin Bronikowski, pianist Vania Batchvarova, guitarist Peter Finger, cellist Ozan Tunca and pianist Zöhrap Adıgüzelzade all performed at the festival.

Çukurova Art Days is a regional festival that has been taking place annually since 2007 in Adana, Mersin, Tarsus, Antakya, İskenderun, Silifke, Anamur and (in the past) in Aleppo.

The 13 Kare Arts Festival began in 1999 as a festival of photography dedicated to 13 Adana photographers who died in an accident during an Adana Photography Amateurs Association trip. Held every December, the festival has since expanded to include other arts such as undersea and architectural photography, puppet shows, shadow theatre and concerts.

The Adana Literature Festival is held every April at the Adana Centre for Arts & Culture. Around 100 writers, poets and critics participate in the festival .

Nightlife

During the mid-20th century, Adana was well known for its vibrant nightlife and many  which mostly functioned as adult entertainment clubs, similar to the Japanese hostess clubs, with live music and a lounge with tables lined up on the ground floor and private rooms upstairs. The first  opened before 1942 with the arrival of Englishmen who worked on the Adana-Ulukışla road that was funded by the British Government in an effort to persuade Turkey to join World War II. By the 1950s landowners who had grown wealthy from the cotton trade opened more and more pavyons along the Seyhan river. In the 1960s, rapid industrialisation brought more patrons from across the country, including from Istanbul and Ankara, and Adana was dubbed the Pavyon Capital of Turkey. Many popular singers owed their fame to the Adana .

The pavyons led the way for Western-style pubs and nightclubs by the late 1980s as Adana underwent big socio-economic changes. The traditional entertainment district was Sular, near the Central Station, but nowadays pubs and clubs are spread throughout the city. The bigger clubs such as Life Legend, Uptown, Casara and Lava, host star singers in elegant locations, mostly along the river and around the lake. There are still two active , Afrodit and Maksim, but now most adult entertainment is directed at what is known locally as tele-bars which are licensed as regular pubs but function as places where bargirls entertain customers. There are around twenty tele-bars mainly in the city centre and around the old dam.

A hundred-year-long tradition of dining on kebab, liver and rakı in the Kazancılar Bazaar, with street music and dancing, turned into a festival with all-night entertainment in 2010. The World Rakı Festival, officially renamed the Adana Kebab and Şalgam Festival, is held on the second Saturday night of December and attracts more than 20,000 people to the old town.

Sports

In the early 20th century coaches were invited to Adana from Istanbul to improve local sporting life. Varag Pogharian and Mateos Zarifian played an important role in organising the athletic movement and the first sports clubs in the city were founded by the Armenian community. in 1913 Adana Türkgücü was founded by Ahmet Remzi Bey and İsmail Sefa Bey in alliance with the Istanbul Türkgücü club that had been initiated by the Committee of Union and Progress. Adana's athletic clubs joined in the Cilician Olympic Games held in April 1914 in a venue north of Dörtyol, a first of its kind for the region. In the 1920s Adana İdman Yurdu, Adana Türk Ocağı, Seyhanspor and Milli Mensucat clubs were all founded and joined the Adana Football League that was established in 1924 along with clubs from other Cilician provinces. Adanaspor, founded in 1932, and Adana Demirspor, founded in 1940, later joined the Çukurova League.

The rivalry between the city's main football clubs, Adanaspor and Adana Demirspor, attracts attraction as a derby rooted in socio-economic divisions.

Football is the most popular sport in Adana although basketball, volleyball and handball are also played widely at professional and amateur levels. Warm weather makes the city a haven for sports like rowing, sailing, swimming and water polo. Horse racing and horse riding are also popular. The biannual Men's European Wheelchair Basketball Championship took place in Adana on 5–15 October 2009; twelve countries competed and Italy won the title after a final game against Turkey. Adana also hosted the 2013 IWBF Men's U23 Wheelchair Basketball World Championship. The 1967 Women's European Volleyball Championship was organised in Turkey with Adana a host city along with Istanbul, Ankara and İzmir. Group C games are played in Adana at the Menderes Sports Hall.

Adanaspor and Adana Demirspor are the two Adana clubs that appear in the Turkish Professional Football League. After twelve years, Adanaspor returned to the Super Lig, in which they had competed for twenty-one years and were the runner up in the 1980–81 season. Adanaspor also performed at the UEFA Cup for three years. Adana Demirspor, currently performing in the TFF First League, was the runner up for the Turkish Cup in the 1977–1978 season and performed in the SuperLig for seventeen years. Both teams use the 5 Ocak Stadium, and matches between them are known as the Adana derby, creating an arch-rival atmosphere found in only three cities in Turkey. Kiremithanespor of the Yüreğir district compete in the Turkish Regional Amateur League. In women's football, Adana İdmanyurduspor compete in the First Football League, and play their home games at the Gençlik Stadium.

Adana ASKİ is the major club for Women's Pro-Basketball, performing in the Turkish Women's Basketball League (TKBL). Adana ASKİ was founded as Ceyhan Belediyespor  in 2000, and was renamed and moved to Adana in 2014. After the move, the club had its best season ever (2014–15), playing in the final of the Turkish Women's Cup and the semi-final of the TKBL First Division. Adana ASKİ also play their home games at Menderes Sports Hall. Adanaspor, relegated to the third tier of the Turkish Men's Basketball League in 2016, play their home games at the Menderes Sports Hall. Wheelchair basketball clubs Adana Engelliler and Martı Engelliler play in the first division of the Turkish Wheelchair Basketball League, both playing their home games at the Serinevler Sports Hall.

Professional volleyball club Adana Toros was promoted to the top flight of the Turkish Men's Volleyball League on 12 April 2016 at the play-off finals in Bursa. Adana Toros play their home games at the Menderes Sports Hall. The city's handball club, Şakirpaşa HEM, was promoted to the Turkish Women's Handball Super League on 21 April 2016, at the play-off finals in Ankara. The venue of Şakirpaşa is Yüreğir Serinevler Arena.

Water sports are also popular in Adana. Adana Demirspor's water polo team is a legend in the community, joining the Turkish Water Polo League in 1942 after Turkey's first modern watersports venue, the Atatürk Swimming Complex, opened in Adana in 1936. The team has a record twenty-two years of straight championship titles in the Turkish Men's Water Polo League, seventeen years of it without losing a game, hence their nickname "The Unbeatables". Demirspor has a total of twenty-nine championship titles.

Rowing became a popular local sport in the last twenty years. Rowing competitions are held all year long on the Seyhan River and the Seyhan Reservoir. The Metropolitan Rowing Club and Çukurova University SK compete at the national and international level. Sailing competitions are also held at the Seyhan Reservoir all year round. The Adana Sailing Club competes at regattas in different categories. In swimming, Erdal Acet of Adana Demirspor is a prominent local figure, who broke the record for swimming the English Channel in nine hours and two minutes in 1976. Recreationally, the lack of swimming pools make the Seyhan River and the irrigation canals attractive for swimmers who want to cool off in the hot, humid summers. With almost one hundred people drowning every year, the Metropolitan Municipality has now opened forty-one swimming pools.

The Adana Half Marathon was inaugurated in 2011 on a national level with the participation of 223 athletes. In 2012, the marathon gained IAAF International Marathon status and hosted 610 athletes from ten nations. The marathon takes place on the first Sunday after 5 January, Adana's Independence Day. The route follows Adana's historic streets and the streets along the Seyhan river.

Horse racing is very popular in Adana. Yeşiloba Hippodrome is one of four Turkish racecourses to host horse racing competitions from October to May. Adana Equestrian Club is Turkey's biggest horse riding centre, hosting national and international competitions.

Contemporary life

Media
The media in Adana is run by national and local agencies. The Çukurova Journalists Union is the umbrella organisation for local media.

Adana has several daily newspapers, the most popular being the Yeni Adana, Ekspres, Toros, Bölge and 5 Ocak papers. The oldest newspaper, Yeni Adana (New Adana), dates back to 1918 and played a significant role in the independence movement after the First World War. Most Adana newspapers serve not only the city but the whole Çukurova region. Many national newspapers have regional publishing centres in Adana. Hürriyet publishes a supplement, Hürriyet Çukurova, which is Turkey's most popular regional newspaper with a circulation of 48,000. Sabah's regional supplement, Güney (South), is also published in Adana.

Kanal A is Adana's longest serving TV broadcaster, Çukurova TV, Akdeniz TV, Koza TV and Kent TV are the other major broadcasters. There are numerous local radio channels and TRT's Çukurova Radio can be listened to in the city.

Shopping

Çakmak Street is the traditional shopping street in the old town. Attempts to pedestrianise it have been unsuccessful because traffic flow can't be diverted. There are several historical bazaars around the Büyük Saat (Clocktower) and Yağ Camii (Oil Mosque). The covered markets around Saydam street, and the Kilis and Mısır bazaars used to be centres for shopping for quality foreign goods.

Ziyapaşa Boulevard is an elegant street where expensive brand-name shops are located. It runs from the D-400 state road to the Central Train Station with the shops are concentrated towards the north end. The streets around Ziyapaşa and the Özal, Demirel and Evren boulevards in northern Adana also feature high-end shops.

Adana has four modern shopping malls. Galleria was the first to be built in the early 1990s. The M1 and Carrefour malls were built during the late 1990s at the west end of the city. Recently opened Optimum Outlet is the first mall east of the river and the closest to the city centre. It has a view of the river and the Merkez (Central) Park.

Education

Schools 
Public, private and not-for-profit institutions are located in Adana. Primary and secondary education in the city is regulated by the provincial directorate of the national Ministry of Education which also administers the state schools.

There are 282 public and 12 private primary schools which pupils attend from grades 1 to 8. From grades 9 to 11, pupils go to one of the 85 public and 26 private high schools. Notable high schools of the city with entrance exams include the state-owned Adana Fen and Adana Anadolu High Schools, and the private Gündoğdu and Bilfen High Schools. The Adana Gundogdu Schools is the largest private school in Adana and expands every year. There are six public and six private schools for pupils with special needs. Nine Community Training Centres help adult residents improve their skills.

Although the city has large Kurdish and Arab communities education in "unofficial" languages is only provided at institutions that do not get government support. Few of them teach Arabic or Kurdish.

The requirement to pass an entrance exam for admission to high schools and universities and for a career in the civil service led to the opening of more than one hundred crammer schools in the city.

Libraries 
The Ramazanoğlu Library was founded in 1923 by combining two smaller libraries. It moved to its current location in the Sabancı Cultural Centre in 1976 and was renamed the Adana Public Library. It also has a branch in the Karacaoğlan Museum of Literature. Seyhan, Yüreğir, Sarıçam and Karaisalı also have public libraries administered by each district. Adana City Library specialises in publications about Adana and Çukurova's history and culture, and has a good collection of photography and films about the city. It is located in the Adana Centre for Arts and Culture.

Fairs 
The fifth Çukurova Book Fair took place in 2012, hosting 182,450 visitors from Çukurova and neighbouring regions. More than two hundred publishers and volunteer organisations had stands, more than 50 cultural events were performed and 300 authors were present to meet their readers. At the same time, the Çukurova Education Fair was organised at the Tüyap Exhibition Centre with the participation of 45 education institutions.

Universities

There are two state universities and one foundation university inside the city and another foundation university just outside it. Universities are regulated by the Council of Higher Education (YÖK).

Çukurova University is a state university located on the eastern shore of the Seyhan Reservoir. In 2008, it was ranked one of the top 500 universities in the world according to research conducted by Blackwell Publishing, Quacquarelli Symonds and The Times. It was founded in 1973 following the merger of the colleges of Agriculture and Medicine. Its campus has many cultural, social and athletic facilities for its 40,000 students.

Adana University for Science and Technology is a newer state university with nine faculties, two institutions and a college.

Çağ University is a not-for-profit tuition-based university founded in 1997. It is  outside the city centre on the way to Tarsus. Most of its 2,500 students commute from Adana, Tarsus and Mersin.

Kanuni University is a recently opened, tuition-based university founded by the Çukurova Education and Culture Foundation.

Healthcare

Adana is a major health centre for a wide area stretching from the Mediterranean to Southeastern Anatolia. It has four university hospitals, eight state hospitals and seven private hospitals.

In the Hastaneler (Hospitals) part of the Seyhan district hospitals - including the Numune General Hospital, the Çukurova State Hospital, the Hospital for Thoracic Diseases and the Military Hospital - line up on both sides of H. Ömer Sabancı Street.

Part of Çukurova University, Balcalı Hospital is a research hospital that was founded in 1987 after the Faculty of Medicine moved to the main campus. It has 1050 inpatient beds in 47 service units, a 58-bed intensive care unit and a 17-bed emergency unit. The largest hospital in Southern and Southeastern Anatolia, it is also one of the biggest hospitals of Turkey.

A new health campus is expected to open in Yüreğir by 2014, which will include a 600-bed General Hospital, 200-bed Heart and Stroke Hospital, 250-bed maternity hospital, 100-bed oncology hospital, 150-bed Physiotherapy and Rehabilitation Centre and 100-bed Psychiatry Hospital. The campus will have a capacity of 1400 inpatients and will be connected to the Hastaneler area via a bridge over the Seyhan river which will create one big campus.

Transportation

In the 16th century, Adana was a port city where ships could navigate along the Seyhan River to the port just south of Taşköprü. It is now on the main route connecting Europe to the Middle East.

Intercity transport

Just west of the old town, Şakirpaşa Airport is an international airport serving the Çukurova region. It is the sixth busiest airport in Turkey serving 5.4 million passengers in 2015. There are international flights to major cities of Germany, to Beirut, Jeddah, Erbil and Nicosia (TRNC), and frequent domestic flights to Istanbul, Ankara, İzmir, Antalya, Trabzon, Bodrum and Van.

Turkish State Railways (TCDD) runs five long-distance lines connecting Adana to Ankara, Kayseri, Karaman, Konya and Elazığ. All these lines use the Central Railway Station while some also use the city's other railway stations—Şehitlik and Şakirpaşa stations to the west, Kiremithane, İncirlik and Yakapınar stations o the east. TCDD also runs three regional lines across Çukurova. The Adana-Mersin Line operates as a commuter train with 27 trains daily. Services to Osmaniye–Islahiye and to Iskenderun run once a day. Regional trains stop at all city stations.

Although they became less popular as private airlines introduced inexpensive flights, buses are still the main form of transport to and from the city. Adana has two intercity bus terminals offering services to almost all Turkey's towns and cities. Bus companies travelling to cities west of Adana depart from the Central Bus Terminal while buses travelling to cities east of Adana depart from Yüreğir Bus Terminal. A shuttle service runs between the two terminals. Regional bus and minibus services from Adana to other places in Çukurova are plentiful. Extra summer bus services operate to the high plains of Tekir, Bürücek and Kızıldağ to enable Adana residents to escape the city heat.

There is an extensive motorway network (O50-O59) connecting Adana to as far as Erdemli in the west, Niğde in the north, Şanlıurfa in the east and Iskenderun in the south. It can take as little as 40 minutes to get to Mersin and two hours to reach Gaziantep.

Local transport

Local transport is provided by the Adana Transit Corporation (a division of the Metropolitan Municipality) and by dolmuş and bus co-operatives. The Transit Corporation runs the Metro and the municipal buses.

Adana Metro is a rapid transit system that extends  from the north-west to the city centre and Yüreğir. The Metro M1 line has thirteen stations and can transport 21,600 passengers an hour in each direction, a complete journey taking twenty minutes. A planned second line will run from Akıncılar to Çukurova University in the Sarıçam District.

The Adana Transit Corporation also operates 229 bus services, eight of them designed specifically for disabled users. Payment is collected via a Kentkart smartcard system. Six Bus Co-operatives (known as Can buses) operate another 411 buses also using the Kentkart. Eighteen dolmuş co-operatives, with a total of 1,086 minibuses, provide services even to minor streets.

Cycling and walking
Adana is mostly flat and the warm weather makes it convenient for year-round cycling and walking. Cycling from one end of the city to the other usually takes less than 40 minutes. Although there are no bike lanes there are two bike paths, one along Fuzuli Street, the other along M. Kemalpaşa Boulevard. When compared to cities like İzmir, Konya and Eskişehir, Adana is less bicycle friendly.

Car-oriented urban planning has become even more extreme since the 1980s, with pedestrians finding parts of the sidewalks of popular streets converted into car parks. Adana has almost no car-free streets or squares. There are plans to convert both ends of Taşköprü (the Stone bridge) into squares and to widen the overcrowded sidewalks in the old town where it is difficult to walk. By far the most pedestrian-friendly street is Turgut Özal Boulevard although Kenan Evren and other major streets in the Çukurova district are also convenient for walking.

International relations
Adana is twinned with:

Gallery

See also 

List of people from Adana
List of twin towns and sister cities in Turkey
List of mayors of Adana
Çukurova
Cilicia

References

Further reading

External links

 Governorship of Adana
 Adana Metropolitan Municipality 
 Adana Trade and Industry Chamber

 
Çukurova
Cities in Turkey
Districts of Adana Province
Former Armenian communities in Turkey
Populated places in Adana Province
Populated places along the Silk Road
Archaeological sites in the Mediterranean Region, Turkey
Hittite cities
Roman sites in Turkey